Lilium catesbaei, sometimes known as Catesby's lily, pine lily, leopard lily, tiger lily, or southern-red lily is a native of Florida and the coastal regions of the American Southeast, where it usually grows in damp areas from Louisiana to Virginia.

Lilium catesbaei requires hot, wet, acidic soil inhospitable to most other lily species. Producing a single flower, it generally blooms late in the year. The flower is upright with 6 tepals (petals and sepals that look very similar). The tepals are curved backward and are orange toward the tip, yellow and purple-spotted toward the base.

See also
Deer Prairie Creek Preserve in Florida, notable for Lilium catesbaei

References

catesbaei
Plants described in 1788
Flora of the Southeastern United States
Taxa named by Thomas Walter (botanist)
Flora without expected TNC conservation status